is a freeware puzzle-oriented horror game by the Japanese game creator Fummy (ふみー), created using the software, RPG Maker VX. The game was first released in October 2012, for Windows computers.

Fummy later released a prequel novel titled, "The Witch's House: The Diary Of Ellen," serving as the in-game diary of the game antagonist Ellen. Starting in 2017, the novel was adapted into a nine-part manga series of the same name illustrated by Yuna Kagesaki, and then condensed into two tankōbon volumes.

Gameplay 
The game is a survival horror game in which the main goal is to solve all puzzles correctly and escape the witch's house. It contains a creepy atmosphere, complex riddles and jump scares. This game is played from bird's-eye view using ornate 16-bit graphics, and controlled via keyboard.

A black, talking cat can be met at various places in the house, serving as a save point, as well as something of a companion. Throughout the vast majority of the game, the cat is the only source of conversation, usually talking in a casual, nonchalant manner.

The player character, however, doesn't have any response until the ending the game, Fummy stating they were influenced by the previous RPGMaker game Ib.

Plot 

The main character of The Witch's House is Viola, a young girl who wakes up in the middle of a forest, soon discovering that her only way out of the forest is completely blocked off by roses. Her only option is to enter a mysterious house nearby in hopes of finding some means of escaping. Accompanied by a black cat, Viola must try to survive the magical and dangerous house, which is possessed by the spirit of the former witch.

During her stay in the house, Viola encounters many strange phenomena inside the shape-shifting house. She also finds diary entries written by the current house's resident, a witch-girl named Ellen, detailing her past and how she killed her parents due to their mistreatment of her. To progress further into the house and hopefully eventually leave the forest, Viola must solve various puzzles, unlocking doors and other sections in the house. If Viola manages to leave the house, there are two possible endings depending on her actions.

The two endings, commonly referred to as the "Good Ending" and the "True Ending", are essentially identical, with the True Ending requiring the player to revisit a cabinet found early in the game to unlock extra dialogue, shedding light on Viola and Ellen's relationship. Both the good ending and the true ending reveal that Viola and Ellen switched bodies before the events of the story, and that "Ellen" (Viola in Ellen's body) attempted to trap "Viola" (Ellen) inside her own house to regain her body. Ellen's reasoning for this was to cure herself of a terminal illness. In both endings, Viola's father appears to rescue his daughter, not knowing of the switch, and shoots "Ellen" to protect his "daughter". Not being recognized by her father causes "Ellen" to die from despair as "Viola" goes home with her father. The third ending is a "pseudo-ending" achieved by not saving once in the game, and gives some extra context to the story's lore such as Ellen's contract with a demon, previous details of how she mutilated herself before the switch, and other details; either ending is achievable by this point.

A separate ending is also attainable by simply waiting in the starting area of the game for an hour and letting the roses fade away due to "Ellen's" body dying from the wounds previously inflicted on it.

Remake 
A commercial remake of the game, titled The Witch's House MV and developed in RPG Maker MV with completely remastered visuals, was released by DANGEN Entertainment for Windows and Macintosh computers in October 2018, with a port to Nintendo Switch, PlayStation 4 and Xbox One following in October 2022.

Legacy 
Clockwork Prince's 2016 Lavender, lists The Witch's House in its dev room as inspiring the game's dual endings.

References

External links 
 The Witch's House at jayisgames.com
 The Witch's House at vgperson.com
The Witch's House at majonoie.karou.jp

2012 video games
Doujin video games
Freeware games
RPG Maker games
2010s horror video games
Windows games
Nintendo Switch games
Video games about witchcraft
Video games developed in Japan
Video games featuring female protagonists
Video games with alternate endings
Video games set in forests
Yen Press titles
Single-player video games